Chrysoesthia verrucosa is a moth of the family Gelechiidae. It is found in the Czech Republic, Slovakia, Austria, Hungary and northern Italy. There are also records from Germany and it is possibly also present in Poland.

The wingspan is 8-9.5 mm.

The larvae feed on Chenopodium species. They mine the leaves of their host plant. The mine has the form of a pear-shaped, full-depth, transparent blotch with a central line of black frass. Larvae can be found in early August.

References

Moths described in 1999
Chrysoesthia
Moths of Europe